Naked refers to the state of nudity.

Naked may also refer to:

Film and television
 Naked (1993 film), a British film directed by Mike Leigh
 Naked (2002 film), a German comedy directed by Doris Dörrie
 Naked (2013 film), an American musical directed by Sean Robinson
 Naked (2017 film), an American comedy directed by Michael Tiddes
 "Naked" (Glee), a 2013 television episode
 "Naked" (New Girl), a 2011 television episode

Literature
 Naked (book), a 1997 essay collection by David Sedaris
 Naked, a 2009 autobiography by Anneke Wills

Music
 Naked Records, a 1990s British record label founded by members of Curiosity Killed the Cat

Bands
 Naked (band), a British duo formed in 2013
 The Naked, a 1989–1999 Danish indie-rock band

Albums
 Naked (Amber album), 2002
 Naked (Art Ensemble of Chicago album), 1986
 Naked (Blue Pearl album), 1990
 Naked (Joan Jett album) or the title song, 2004
 Naked (Kissing the Pink album), 1983
 Naked (Louise album) or the title song (see below), 1996
 Naked (Marques Houston album) or the title song (see below), 2005
 Naked (Soulhead album), 2006
 Naked (Talking Heads album), 1988
 Naked (Zheng Jun album), 1994
 Naked, by Andy Griggs, 2013
 Naked, by Doug Pinnick, 2013
 Naked, by Kang In-soo, 2017
 Naked, by Sex Gang Children, 1982
 Naked, by Sowelu, 2008
 Naked, an EP by Reona, 2022

Songs
 "Naked" (Ava Max song), 2020
 "Naked" (Dev and Enrique Iglesias song), 2011
 "Naked" (Falco song), 1996
 "Naked" (Goo Goo Dolls song), 1996
 "Naked" (James Arthur song), 2017
 "Naked" (Kevin McCall song), 2012
 "Naked" (Louise song), 1996
 "Naked" (Marques Houston song), 2005
 "Naked" (Tiësto song), an alternative version of "Wasted", 2014
 "Naked"/"Fight Together"/"Tempest", by Namie Amuro, 2011
 "Naked", by Avril Lavigne from Let Go, 2002
 "Naked", by Brymo from Klĭtôrĭs, 2016
 "Naked", by Celine Dion from One Heart, 2003
 "Naked", by DNCE from  DNCE, 2016
 "Naked", by Doja Cat from Planet Her, 2021
 "Naked", by Finneas O'Connell, 2022
 "Naked", by Jason Derulo, 2016
 "Naked", by Jonas Blue and Max Schneider, 2020
 "Naked", by Leona Lewis from Echo, 2009
 "Naked", by Mikuni Shimokawa, 2000
 "Naked", by Miley Cyrus from Plastic Hearts, 2020
 "Naked", by Reef from Replenish, 1995
 "Naked", by the Spice Girls from Spice, 1996
 "Naked", by Taeyang from White Night, 2017
 "Naked", by Tracy Bonham from Blink the Brightest, 2005

Other uses		
 Daihatsu Naked, an automobile
 Naked bike, a class of motorcycles
 Naked cuticle (Nkd), a family of proteins
 Naked Juice, a brand of fruit drinks

See also
 
 
 Nude (disambiguation)